Serafín Álvarez Quintero (March 26, 1871 – April 12, 1938) and Joaquín Álvarez Quintero (January 20, 1873 – June 14, 1944) were Spanish dramatists.

Biography

Their first stage piece, was written in 1889. Both brothers were members of the Royal Spanish Academy.

They were named the favorite brothers of Utrera and Seville. Their works were translated into several languages,  and they performed in the most remote areas of the spanish speaking world, such as in the Teatro Colón in Buenos Aires, by the Guerrero-Mendoza company that carried several of their works when the theater was built, due to this the brothers enjoyed innumerable tributes, making their works well-known into the 1920s.

Both were imprisoned at the beginning of the Civil War in El Escorial. Serafín would die of natural causes in 1938, and Melchor Rodríguez García had to intercede to allow Serafin's sister to bring a crucifix to his coffin, as had Serafín wished, but had been given refusal by militiamen at the mortuary house. Joaquín would die in 1944, and the remains of both rest in the San Justo Cemetery in Madrid.

They were also famous for having tried to transcribe Andalusian dialects to written form.

Work

Many of their pieces are of a costumbrismo nature, describing what it's like being from their native Andalusian lands, but leaving aside the gloomy and miserable vision of social ills. In the thirties their art was used in the cinema, creating several scripts for the films of the mythical Estrellita Castro. They did not contribute any substantial technical or structural novelty, but they refined Andalusianism in the same way that Carlos Arniches did. In Madrid, However, they never went further indepth with their social ideas, which stops at tenderness and melodramatics. In short, they are bourgeois comedies that offer an idealized and friendly vision of Andalusia that does not worry the average viewer; the joy of living silences any hint of dramatic conflict. It was this joie de vivre that saved the theater of the Quintero brothers from critics such as Ramón Pérez de Ayala, José Martínez Ruiz and Luis Cernuda.

Their Complete Works were published in Madrid: , 1918-1947, in forty-two volumes.

Bibliography
 Javier Huerta, Emilio Peral, Héctor Urzaiz, Teatro español de la A a la Z. Madrid: Espasa-Calpe, 2005.

External links
 
 
 
 

People from Utrera
19th-century Spanish writers
19th-century male writers
20th-century Spanish writers
20th-century Spanish male writers
Members of the Royal Spanish Academy